Jahangir Alam (born March 5, 1973) is a former Bangladeshi cricketer who played in 3 ODIs from 1997 to 1999.
An opening batsman who could keep wicket if necessary, Jahangir Alam was ideally suited for one day cricket. Unfortunately for Bangladesh, though enormously successful in domestic arena, he failed to perform up to expectation at the international level.

Early days
Jahangir was born on March 5, 1973, in Narayanganj, Dhaka. He first came into prominence during the U-19 tour of England in the summer of 1989. He started the tour with a hundred and continued to score consistently after that. his 132 against Wycombe was the highest score in the tour. In the process he shared a 210 run opening partnership with Javed Omar. Jahangir Alam scored 35 against Homestead & 40 against Wakeham Overall in 5 matches he scored 219 runs at an average of 43.80.
In contrast, he was a big failure in the Asian U-19 Cup in Dec. 1989. His highest score of 38 in 4 matches came against Sri Lanka at Chittagong.

In ICC Trophy
Apart from this, his most successful time in international cricket came during the 1994 ICC Trophy in Kenya. His century (117*) against the eventual champions UAE was the only bright point for his team, in what was a miserable campaign for them. Jahangir followed his hundred with 48 against Netherland & 57 against Kenya. ironically, Bnalgadesh lost all of these three games.  He finished with 283 runs at an average of 47.16 runs per innings. He was also a member of the Bangladesh team that won the ICC Trophy in 1997. However, he played in only one of the matches (against the hosts Malaysia, in the Group stages).

References

1973 births
Living people
Jahangir Alam
Bangladeshi cricketers
Chittagong Division cricketers
Dhaka Division cricketers
Wicket-keepers
People from Narayanganj District